The Strand Theater is an abandoned neighborhood movie theater, located at 5129–5131 Nannie Helen Burroughs Avenue, Northeast, Washington, D.C., in the Deanwood neighborhood.

History
Abe E. Lichtman opened the movie theater, on November 3, 1928.

The city bought the property out of foreclosure for $230,000 in September 2006.
Redevelopment was delayed.
It was named an endangered place by the D.C. Preservation League in 2007.
It was placed on the National Register of Historic Places on November 25, 2008.
In 2010, developers received approval of a plan for redevelopment, of the theater, by the Board of Zoning Appeals.

See also
 National Register of Historic Places listings in the District of Columbia
 Theater in Washington D.C.

References

External links 
 http://cinematreasures.org/theaters/22851
 http://rmc-architects.com/portfolio/preservation/strand.htm

Theatres on the National Register of Historic Places in Washington, D.C.
Art Deco architecture in Washington, D.C.
Theatres in Washington, D.C.
Theatres completed in 1928
1928 establishments in Washington, D.C.